Scott Steen  is an American trumpeter.

Steen was a longtime member of the Royal Crown Revue. He has performed with Cirque du Soleil, and has toured with the cast of the musical West Side Story as lead trumpeter. Steen was described as “a chameleon” by All About Jazz for his ability to play convincingly in many styles, including bop, avant-garde, blues, and boogaloo.  He has performed in Los Angeles, Moscow, London, and Tokyo.

He was the featured soloist with Royal Crown Revue for Bette Midler during her Kiss My Brass tour 2003–2005. He has also performed with Brian Setzer, Mark Whitfield, Sherman Ferguson, Phil Upchurch, and Stewart Copeland.

In addition to his recordings with other groups his solo CDs include Makin’ Time and Playing Favorites.  His solo project “Remembering Miles“, is a tribute to trumpeter Miles Davis, with backing from Matteo Alfonso on piano, Simone Serafini on bass, and Tommaso Cappellato on drums.

Steen also teaches drumming.

Festival appearances
Playboy, Hollywood Bowl; Newport Jazz; JVC, NY; JVC, Saratoga; Mt. Hood, OR;Berks, PA; Boston, MA; Reading, England; Gaildorf, Germany; Viel Jazz, Switzerland; Roskilde, Denmark; Tantsy, Moscow; Playboy, Pasadena; Newport Beach, CA; Postojna Jazz, Slovenia; Lake Como, Italy; Parco Delta, Italy; Bologna, Jazz nella Piazza, Italy; Sibenik, Croatia; Gyor Blues, Hungary; Varazdin, Croatia

Media appearances

The Mask, Buffy the Vampire Slayer, Jay Leno, Conan O’Brien, Ellen DeGeneres, Good Morning America, CNN, CBS World News, Good News Australia. Comedy Central, BBC3, All Things Considered (recorded a version of the show's theme), PBS

References

American male trumpeters
Living people
21st-century trumpeters
21st-century American male musicians
Year of birth missing (living people)